Pohang City is a South Korean soccer club based in the city of Pohang.

It is a lower league club, appearing outside the top two divisions, the K-League and the N-League.

However, it took part in the Korean FA Cup 2006.

Amateur football clubs in South Korea
Pohang